On 10 January 2017, multiple bombings in Afghanistan occurred at government and tribal establishments during the renewed War in Afghanistan. The Taliban claimed responsibility for all but one of the attacks, which targeted a United Arab Emirates diplomatic mission. In total, at least 64 to at least 88 people were killed and at least 94 were wounded, with at least three attackers also being killed. Other attacks may have taken place.

Bombings

First bombing
The first attack was a twin suicide bombing in front of the National Assembly of Afghanistan in the capital Kabul. The Taliban claimed responsibility for this attack that killed at least 46 people, mostly parliament workers, and wounded over 70, while they claimed that 70 were killed. The target was a National Directorate of Security minibus. There were two bombers, one on foot and one in a car.

Second bombing
The second attack occurred at Governor Humayun Azizi's guesthouse in Kandahar, when the United Arab Emirates ambassador Juma Al Kaabi and his fellow diplomats were being hosted for dinner. The UAE ambassador and diplomats were on a visit to Kandahar to lay the foundation stone for an orphanage to be built and sponsored by the UAE government. A hidden bomb was detonated during the meeting, killing at least 11 people and wounding at least 18. Among both the dead and the injured were many prominent Afghan politicians and diplomats, including 5 Emirati diplomats who were killed in the blast. The UAE Ambassador to Afghanistan, Juma Al Kaabi, was also injured during the attack, and died of his injuries more than a month later, on February 15. Abdul Ali Shamsi, Kandahar's deputy governor, was also among those killed. 

Although suspected, the Taliban did not claim responsibility for the bombing and instead blamed it on "internal local rivalry". Much of the bombing was orchestrated by a longtime cook named Sayeed Mahboob Agha. Agha had previously worked as a cook for members of the Taliban, and was known to have ongoing contact with the Taliban. Agha moved from Farah province to Kandahar to work at the Kandahar governor's guesthouse, on the recommendation of Taliban acquaintances. He was later offered $30,000 and a residence in Pakistan in exchange for smuggling a bomb into the guesthouse.

Third bombing
A third bombing occurred in Lashkargah, where at least seven to 16 civilians were killed and six to nine were injured, not including the deceased suicide bomber. The Taliban claimed responsibility for the attack that targeted a tribal elder.

Victims 

The bombings killed numerous civilians, diplomats, and guards. In total, at least 64 to at least 88 people were killed and at least 94 were wounded. Some of the named victims include:
 Five UAE diplomats, killed. The diplomats are Mohammed Ali Al Bastaki, Abdullah Mohammed Al Kaabi, Ahmed Rashid Al Mazroui, Ahmed Abdul Rahman Al Tunaiji, and Abdul Hamid Sultan Al Hammadi.
 UAE Ambassador Juma Al Kaabi, wounded, later died of wounds in February 2017.
 Governor Humayun Azizi, wounded.
 Deputy governor Abdul Ali Shamsi, killed.
 MP Rahima Jami, wounded.
 Hashim Karzai, cousin of former president Hamid Karzai, wounded, later died of wounds on 16 January 2017.

Reactions 

The attacks triggered widespread condemnations and were denounced by multiple countries, organizations, and world leaders including the United Nations, UN Security Council, and the Gulf Cooperation Council.

Flags in the United Arab Emirates were flown at half mast for 3 days. Condolences poured and the country's ministries, government departments and institutions honoured those killed. The United Arab Emirates stated that the attack on its diplomats would not stop it from continuing its humanitarian presence in Afghanistan.

See also
List of Islamist terrorist attacks
List of terrorist incidents, 2017
List of terrorist attacks in Kabul

References 

2017 murders in Afghanistan
2017 in Kabul
Afghanistan–United Arab Emirates relations
January 2017 crimes in Asia
Mass murder in 2017
Mass murder in Kabul
Taliban attacks
Terrorist incidents in Afghanistan in 2017
Islamic terrorist incidents in 2017
Military operations of the War in Afghanistan (2001–2021)
Attacks on buildings and structures in Afghanistan
Explosions in 2017
Terrorist incidents in Kabul
Attacks in Afghanistan in 2017